The Supertest Ladies Open was a golf tournament on the LPGA Tour from 1966 to 1969. It was played in Ontario, Canada at the Sunningdale Golf Club in London from 1966 to 1967 and at the Bayview Golf & Country Club in Thornhill from 1968 to 1969. It was the first LPGA Tour event to be played in Canada. The title sponsor was Supertest Petroleum, a Canadian petroleum company.

Winners
Ladies' Supertest Open
1969 Sandra Haynie

Supertest Canadian Open
1968 Carol Mann

Supertest Ladies' Open
1967 Carol Mann

Supertest Ladies Open
1966 Kathy Whitworth

References

Former LPGA Tour events
Women's golf tournaments in Canada
Sport in London, Ontario
Women in Ontario